John Alexis Edgren (February 20, 1839 – January 26, 1908) was a Swedish-American Baptist minister. Edgren began what eventually evolved into Bethel University and the Bethel Theological Seminary in St. Paul, Minnesota.

Background
Johan Alexis Edgren was born at Östanås, in Älvsbacka, Värmland, Sweden. He was the son of Axel Edgren and Mathilda Berger and the brother of noted Swedish-American linguist August Hjalmar Edgren. He attended and completed elementary school in Karlstad. He qualified for the rank of captain in the navigation school of Stockholm. He went to America in 1862, and received a commission in the Union Navy during the American Civil War. He subsequently trained at Princeton Theological Seminary and the Baptist Theological Seminary in Hamilton, New York.

Edgren was also a skilled artist. He produced many large oil paintings and drawings now located at Bethel University. Subjects include the Stockholm Palace, landscapes, seascapes, harbor scenes, and eyewitness scenes of the Civil War.

Career
Edgren was ordained as a Baptist minister in 1866 at the Mariners' Baptist Church in New York. He then spent some time as a missionary in Sweden, sent by the American Baptist Missionary Union. A soldier, author, and journalist, Edgren served at First Swedish Baptist Church in Chicago starting in 1871. The same year, he founded the periodical , later becoming the Standard, a Baptist newspaper. Edgren opened a department for Scandinavian theological students in the fall of 1871 in the basement of his church for ministerial students. The Baptist Theological Union of the University of Chicago invited Edgren to house a seminary at their location. The seminary was housed with the Baptist Theological Union from 1871 until 1884 when Edgren resigned.  Subsequently, the seminary moved to the facilities of First Swedish Baptist Church in St. Paul, Minnesota where it became a seminary of the Baptist General Conference.

See also 

 Oscar Broady – contemporaneous Swedish Baptist missionary
 Gustaf Palmquist – contemporaneous Swedish Baptist missionary
 Anders Wiberg – contemporaneous Swedish Baptist missionary

References

Sources

External links
Edgren Scholars Award at Bethel University
Edgren Hall at Bethel University
John Edgren's Home in Morgan Park, Chicago, Illinois

1839 births
1908 deaths
Baptist ministers from the United States
Swedish emigrants to the United States
Swedish military officers
Union Navy officers
People from Karlstad Municipality
Princeton Theological Seminary alumni
19th-century American clergy